The Besançon–Le Locle railway line is a standard gauge railway line in the region of Bourgogne-Franche-Comté in France. A small section of the line extends into the canton of Neuchâtel in Switzerland. SNCF owns and operates the line.

Operation 
TER Bourgogne-Franche-Comté operates passenger services over the line.

References

External links 
 
 2022 timetable

Cross-border railway lines in France
Cross-border railway lines in Switzerland
Railway lines in Switzerland
Railway lines in Bourgogne-Franche-Comté